Stephen Robertson (born 16 March 1977 in Glasgow) is a Scottish former professional footballer who played as a goalkeeper.

Robertson began his career at St. Johnstone, where he progressed through the youth system along with Danny Griffin and Stuart McCluskey, sometimes playing in outfield positions, and eventually made thirteen league appearances for the first team. As an understudy to St Johnstone's first-choice goalkeeper Alan Main, Robertson made his Scottish Premier League debut on 21 February 1998, against Aberdeen. He was called up to the Scotland under-21 squad in March 2000.

Robertson ended his seven-year association with St Johnstone in May 2001 when he was released on a free transfer. He moved to Clydebank. After one year there, he joined Stranraer on trial, before joining Airdrie United. He then moved on to Alloa Athletic in June 2010. He joined Junior side Kirkintilloch Rob Roy in August 2011.

In June 2020, Robertson was announced as the coach of Yoker Athletic's newly launched under-20 development squad.

Honours
Airdrie United
Scottish Challenge Cup: 2008–09

References

External links

Robertson shines against Rangers
Independent site profile

1977 births
Footballers from Glasgow
Living people
Association football goalkeepers
Scottish footballers
St Johnstone F.C. players
Hamilton Academical F.C. players
Clydebank F.C. (1965) players
Stranraer F.C. players
Airdrieonians F.C. players
Alloa Athletic F.C. players
Kirkintilloch Rob Roy F.C. players
Scottish Premier League players
Scottish Football League players
Scottish Junior Football Association players
Scotland under-21 international footballers